A university press is an academic publishing house that is typically affiliated with a large research university.

University Press may refer to:
 University Press (Florida Atlantic University), a student-run newspaper at Florida Atlantic University in Boca Raton, Florida
 University Press (Lamar University), a student-run newspaper at Lamar University in Beaumont, Texas
 University Press of America, an academic book publisher, part of the Rowman & Littlefield Publishing Group
 University Press plc, an academic book publisher, headquartered in Ibadan, Nigeria
 Canadian University Press, a newswire service owned by student newspapers in Canada

as well as:
 Cambridge University Press, the publishing house of the University of Cambridge
 Oxford University Press, the publishing house of the University of Oxford

See also
 
 List of university presses
 :Category:University presses
 :Category:University presses by country